Sandra Starke (born 31 July 1993) is a Namibian-born German footballer who plays as a forward for Frauen-Bundesliga club VfL Wolfsburg and the Germany women's national team.

She is the sister of Namibian international footballer Manfred Starke. She was born in Windhoek, Namibia to a Namibian-born German father and a Dutch mother.

Career statistics

Club

International

International goal
Scores and results list Germany's goal tally first:

References

External links
 Germany player profile
 Profile at soccerdonna.de

1993 births
Living people
Women's association football forwards
German women's footballers
Germany women's international footballers
German people of Namibian descent
German people of Dutch descent
Frauen-Bundesliga players
1. FFC Turbine Potsdam players
SC Freiburg (women) players
VfL Wolfsburg (women) players
2. Frauen-Bundesliga players
Namibian women's footballers
Footballers from Windhoek
White Namibian people
Namibian people of German descent
Namibian people of Dutch descent